Kameron Marlowe, born in 1997 in Kannapolis, North Carolina, is an American country music singer-songwriter signed to Columbia Nashville. He was a contestant on season 15 of NBC's The Voice. His debut single, "Giving You Up" was released on June 14, 2019.

Early life and education 
Marlowe was born and raised in Kannapolis, North Carolina. He has a younger brother, Aidan. As a child, Kameron became interested in music through his grandfather, who listened to country radio when they went hunting and fishing together. He started singing in church when he was 10 years old and later became a worship leader. Marlowe attended A.L. Brown High School, where he joined a band and performed around town before graduating in 2015.

In 2017, Marlowe's mother was diagnosed with a degenerative disc injury in her back and had to quit her job. To help support her, Marlowe dropped out of college and began working as an auto parts salesman for General Motors while playing gigs locally.

The Voice 
While working as a car parts salesman in Kannapolis, Marlowe received a call from a talent recruiter from The Voice who had seen his live performance videos on YouTube. They offered Marlowe a fast track to the series' live auditions. He debuted on the show's Blind Auditions premiere on September 24, 2018. Subsequently, he joined Blake Shelton's Team Blake before being "stolen" by coach Adam Levine later in the season. He was eliminated in the Live Playoffs Top 24 episode on November 13, 2018. Subsequently, Marlowe moved to Nashville, Tennessee to pursue a career as a songwriter.

Career 
In June 2019, Marlowe independently released his debut song, "Giving You Up" and followed it with "Take You Up On It" in October. By April 2020, "Giving You Up" had amassed over 15 million on-demand streams, and Marlowe signed a management deal with AMG. That same month, he unveiled a music video for the song, which later premiered on CMT's 12 Pack Countdown. In May 2020, Marlowe signed a songwriting deal with Sony/ATV Music Publishing.

On June 26, 2020, Sony Music Nashville announced that Marlowe had signed a recording deal with its Columbia Nashville imprint. Marlowe released his first song through the label, "Burn 'Em All" on the same day. On September 30, 2021, "Giving You Up" was certified Gold by the RIAA, becoming Marlowe's first song to earn a certification.

Discography

Studio albums

Singles

Other charted songs

Music videos

References 

Living people
Sony Music artists
American country singer-songwriters
The Voice (franchise) contestants
1997 births
Country musicians from North Carolina
Singer-songwriters from North Carolina